Tate Gallery (25 February 1983 – 1990) was an American-bred Thoroughbred racehorse and sire. A full-brother to Sadler's Wells he won two of his five races in a track career which lasted from August 1985 until May 1986. As a two-year-old he finished unplaced in the Phoenix Stakes on his debut before winning a maiden race and then recorded his biggest victory in the National Stakes. In the following spring he ran third in the Gladness Stakes and then finished last in the 2000 Guineas before being retired from racing. In a brief stud career he sired several good winners, most notably Lyric Fantasy.

Background
Tate Gallery was a bay horse with a broad white blaze and white socks on his hind legs bred in Kentucky by Robert Sangster's Swettenham Stud. During his racing career he carried the colours of the Greek shipping tycoon Stavros Niarchos and was trained at Ballydoyle by Vincent O'Brien. Both Sangster and Niarchos were partner in John Magnier's Coolmore Stud organisation.

Tate Gallery was sired by the Canadian stallion Northern Dancer who won the Kentucky Derby in 1964 and went on to become one of the most influential sires of the 20th century. His dam Fairy Bridge was bought for $40,000 by Sangster in 1976 and was undefeated in a brief racing career consisting of two races as a juvenile in 1977. In the Irish Free Handicap for that year she was rated the joint-best two-year-old filly alongside Sookera. As a broodmare she was an outstanding success, with her other foals including Tate Gallery's full-brothers Sadler's Wells and Fairy King. She came from an exceptional family, being a half-sister to Nureyev and a close relative of Thatch

Racing career

1985: two-year-old season
Tate Gallery had a challenging introduction to the track when he was ridden by Pat Eddery in the Group 1 Phoenix Stakes over six furlongs at Phoenix Park Racecourse on 10 August. O'Brien had not intended to run the colt in the race but changed his plans when Tate Gallery's better-fancied stablemate Woodman fell sick. Despite his lack of experience he was made the 5/4 favourite but finished unplaced behind Roaring Riva, with Eddery easing him down when it became apparent that he had no chance of winning. Later that month he recorded his first success in a maiden race over even furlongs at the Curragh, winning "smoothly" from nineteen opponents.

In the National Stakes (run as a Group 1 race for the first time) over seven furlongs at the Curragh on 14 September Tate Gallery was ridden by Cash Asmussen and started the 4/6 favourite. The best of his eight opponents appeared to be the British filly Sweet Adelaide and the Jim Bolger-trained colt Nashamaa both of whom came ito the race unbeaten. After tracking the leaders Tate Gallery went to the front two furlongs out and stayed on well under pressure to win by one and a half lengths from Nashamaa with Sweet Adelaide a further one and a half length back in third.

In the official International Classification for 1985, Tate Gallery was given a rating of 77, six pounds behind the top-rated Bakharoff. The independent Timeform organisation gave him a rating of 117p (with the "p" indicating that he was expected to make more than usual improvement) making him fourteen pounds inferior to their best two-year-old Huntingdale.

1986: three-year-old season
Tate Gallery began his second season in the Gladness Stakes over seven furlongs at the Curragh in which he was matched against older horses. He finished third behind the four-year-old Lidhame with Timeform reporting that he "hung left and lacked enthusiasm". Despite his poor effort at the Curragh he was sent to England for the 2000 Guineas at Newmarket Racecourse on 3 May. He was ridden by Tony Ives after O'Brien had first offered the ride to the recently retired Lester Piggott. He made no impact, coming home last of the fourteen finishers behind Dancing Brave and never raced again.

Stud career
Tate Gallery was retired to stud and became a breeding stallion for the Coolmore Stud in County Tipperary at an initial fee of 15,000 guineas. He died in an accident in 1990 at the age of seven.

By far the best of his offspring was the exceptionally fast and precocious filly Lyric Fantasy, but he sired a few other good winners including Surrealist (Godolphin Stakes), Title Roll (King George Stakes) and Lee Artiste (Sandy Lane Stakes) He was also the damsire of the Prix de l'Abbaye winner Namid.

Pedigree

References

1983 racehorse births
1990 racehorse deaths
Racehorses bred in Kentucky
Racehorses trained in Ireland
Thoroughbred family 5-h